Héctor Rodríguez Torres (born August 12, 1951) is a Cuban judoka and Olympic champion. He won a gold medal at the 1976 Summer Olympics in Montreal. by defeating South Korea's Chang Eun-kyung in the final.

References

radiorebelde

1951 births
Living people
Olympic judoka of Cuba
Judoka at the 1972 Summer Olympics
Judoka at the 1976 Summer Olympics
Judoka at the 1980 Summer Olympics
Olympic gold medalists for Cuba
Olympic medalists in judo
Cuban male judoka
Medalists at the 1976 Summer Olympics
Pan American Games medalists in judo
Pan American Games bronze medalists for Cuba
Judoka at the 1979 Pan American Games
Medalists at the 1979 Pan American Games
20th-century Cuban people
21st-century Cuban people